United Networks is an Internet service provider (ISP) and media distributor that was established in Kuwait on 1 October, 2005. The company is a member of KIPCO and has several subsidiary companies.

External links
Official website of United Networks (Kuwait)
Official website of United Networks UK

Telecommunications companies established in 2005
Companies of Kuwait
Telecommunications companies of Kuwait
Kuwaiti companies established in 2005